Gordon Sykes (born Scotland) is a Scottish former rugby union player for Glasgow Warriors and  Ayr, who played at the Tighthead Prop position.

Amateur level

Sykes played for Ayr RFC.

He played for Ayr RFC in the British and Irish Cup.

Professional level

In 2001-02 season, Sykes was called up for a combined Glasgow - Edinburgh team to face Newcastle Falcons 'A' side. He also played in the Glasgow side that faced Northampton Saints. He was named in Glasgow's squad to face the Scotland U21 side.

In season 2002-03, Sykes remained in Glasgow Warriors squad. He played for the Warriors in their match against Scottish Exiles. He was in Glasgow's side that faced Harlequins.

Sykes was a backup player for Glasgow Warriors for season 2003-04.

References

External links
Ayr tighten their grip - Glasgow Warriors.com
Week Six - Glasgow Warriors.com
Rugby: Division two matches - The Scotsman
Statbunker Profile
Currie v Ayr preview - Ayr RFC
BT Premiership One round-up - BBC
Ayr Rugby Club struggle to beat Hawick at Millbrae - Daily Record

Living people
Scottish rugby union players
Glasgow Warriors players
Year of birth missing (living people)
Rugby union props